Nathan Ngoumou Minpole (born 14 March 2000) is a French professional footballer who plays as a midfielder for  club Borussia Mönchengladbach.

Club career
A youth product of Toulouse, Ngoumou signed his first professional contract with his boyhood club in November 2018. He made his professional debut for Toulouse in a 2–1 Ligue 1 loss to Dijon on 24 May 2019.

On 30 August 2022, Ngoumou signed a five-year contract with Borussia Mönchengladbach in Germany.

International career
Born in France, Ngoumou is of Cameroonian and Gabonese descent. On 5 February 2019, he was called up to represent the France U19s.

Personal life
Ngoumou's is the cousin of the Cameroonian international footballer Achille Emaná, and his grandfather Clément Ebozo'o Eya'a was the second Gabonese footballer to play in the Division 1 in the 1960s.

Honours
Toulouse
Ligue 2: 2021–22

Individual
UNFP Ligue 2 Team of the Year: 2021–22

References

External links
 
 
 
 Les Violets Profile
 TFC Profile

2000 births
French sportspeople of Cameroonian descent
French sportspeople of Gabonese descent
Living people
Footballers from Toulouse
Association football midfielders
French footballers
France youth international footballers
France under-21 international footballers
Toulouse FC players
Borussia Mönchengladbach players
Ligue 1 players
Ligue 2 players
Championnat National 3 players
French expatriate footballers
Expatriate footballers in Germany
French expatriate sportspeople in Germany